Herta Mayen (1922–2015) was an Austrian dancer and stage and film actress.

Selected filmography
 Hotel Sacher (1939)
 Love Me (1942)
 The Singing House (1948)
 Spring on Ice (1951)

References

Bibliography 
 Fritsche, Maria. Homemade Men In Postwar Austrian Cinema: Nationhood, Genre and Masculinity . Berghahn Books, 2013.

External links 
 

1922 births
2015 deaths
Austrian female dancers
Dancers from Vienna
Austrian stage actresses
Austrian film actresses
Actresses from Vienna
20th-century Austrian actresses
20th-century dancers